Bohemia Farm, also known as Milligan Hall, is a historic home located on the Bohemia River at Earleville, Cecil County, Maryland.  It is a five bays wide, Flemish bond brick Georgian style home built about 1743.  Attached is a frame, 19th century gambrel-roof wing.  The house interior features elaborate decorative plasterwork of the Rococo style and the full "Chinese Chippendale" staircase.  It was "part-time" home of Louis McLane.

The estate was founded by Augustine Herman, a Bohemian-born cartographer from Mšeno.

Ephraim, the oldest son of Herman, was among the principal converts to the Labadist faith, a Frisian Pietist sect that practiced a form of Christian communism that emphasized asceticism, plain dress, gender equality, and universal priesthood. In 1683, Augustine Herman granted 3,750 acres (15 km2) of land to the Labadists to form a colony. The Labadist commune never managed to gain more than 100 settlers and ceased to exist after 1720.

It was listed on the National Register of Historic Places in 1973.

References

External links
, including photo from 1970, at Maryland Historical Trust

Christian communism
Communism in Maryland
Czech-American culture in Maryland
Dutch-American culture
Frisian diaspora
Houses on the National Register of Historic Places in Maryland
Houses in Cecil County, Maryland
Houses completed in 1743
Georgian architecture in Maryland
Historic American Buildings Survey in Maryland
National Register of Historic Places in Cecil County, Maryland
1743 establishments in Maryland